is a Japanese whisky distillery.

References

Notes

Bibliography

External links

  (in Japanese)

Distilleries in Japan
Japanese whisky
Companies based in Fukushima Prefecture
2016 establishments in Japan
Japanese brands